Fran Borgia (born 1980, Jerez de la Frontera, Spain) is a film producer based in Singapore since 2004. He is the founder of Akanga Film Asia.

Career 
He was the producer and editor for Here (2009), Ho Tzu Nyen’s first feature film that was presented at the 41st Directors’ Fortnight, Cannes Film Festival 2009; and for the medium-length film, Earth, presented at the 66th Venice Film Festival 2009.

Since then he has produced noteworthy feature films such as Sandcastle (2010), Boo Junfeng’s first feature film that premiered at the 49th Cannes Critics’ Week in 2010; Disappearing Landscape by Vladimir Todorovic, which premiered at the 42nd International Film Festival Rotterdam 2013, and Mister John by Christine Molloy & Joe Lawlor, a UK-Ireland-Singapore co-production, which premiered at the Edinburgh International Film Festival 2013.

In 2015, he produced K Rajagopal’s segment for the omnibus feature 7 Letters (2015). In 2016, he co-produced Lav Diaz’s A Lullaby to the Sorrowful Mystery (2016), which won the Silver Bear Alfred Bauer Prize for "a feature film that opens new perspectives" at the 66th Berlin International Film Festival. In the same year, he also produced two films that premiered at the Cannes Film Festival: Boo Junfeng’s Apprentice (2016) at Un Certain Regard and K. Rajagopal’s A Yellow Bird (2016) at International Critics' Week.

In 2017, he produced Liao Jiekai’s segment for the omnibus feature 667 that screened at 22nd Busan International Film Festival. In 2018, he produced Yeo Siew Hua’s A Land Imagined (2018), that won the Pardo d’oro (Golden Leopard) at the Locarno Film Festival.

Filmography

As Producer
 Here (2009) (as film editor also)
 Sandcastle (2010)
 Disappearing Landscape (2013)
 Mister John (2013)
 7 Letters (2015)
 A Lullaby to the Sorrowful Mystery (2016)
 Apprentice (2016)
 A Yellow Bird (2016) (as film editor also)
 667 (2017)
 A Land Imagined (2018)
Yuni (2021)

References

External links 
 

1980 births
Spanish film producers
Singaporean film producers
Living people